Stavky may refer to:

Stavky (river), a river in Ukraine
Stavky, Horlivka Raion, a populated area in Ukraine